Daisy Betts Miller (born 1 February 1982) is an Australian actress, who starred in Out of the Blue and Persons Unknown. Betts appeared in the 2010 motion picture Caught Inside, directed by Adam Blaiklock and starring Ben Oxenbould, Sam Lyndon, Simon Lyndon, Leeanna Walsman, Harry Cook, and Peter Phelps. Betts starred on the ABC TV series Last Resort playing Lieutenant Grace Shepard.

Personal life
Daisy Betts was born in Sydney, New South Wales. She has three sisters. She studied commerce and psychology before deciding to pursue a career in acting.

She has a daughter and a son with her husband Paul Miller.

Career
Betts made her television debut as Amber, a minor character on the final show of the 2006 Australian TV movie Small Claims. She had a small role as the character Natasha in the 2008 American horror film Shutter, and a recurring role as Sally Blake, the wife of Chris Blake, on the 2007–2008 Australian TV series Sea Patrol. In 2008, Betts performed in the most prominent role of her career, as the major character Peta Lee on 59 episodes of the Australian/UK soap opera, Out of the Blue.

In 2010, she was cast as Janet Cooper on the NBC thriller Persons Unknown. She played a single mother from San Francisco who owned a daycare center, and was mysteriously abducted. After the abduction, her character appeared in a ghost town with several strangers. She became the object of desire for multiple characters (both male and female) in the town.

Betts starred in the Independent Australian film Caught Inside, which was released in September 2010.

Daisy Betts starred as Lieutenant Grace Shepard in the ABC military drama series Last Resort, which premiered on September 27, 2012.

In 2014 she had a recurring role on Chicago Fire as Rebecca Jones.

Filmography

Film

Television

References

External links

21st-century Australian actresses
1982 births
Living people
Actresses from Sydney